Council of Europe–European Union relations are the bilateral relations between the Council of Europe and the European Union. The Council of Europe and the European Union have shared relations since 1992. Almost 180 programmes have been implemented between the two European organisations in areas such as human rights, culture, democracy, and the rule of law.

Issues

Accession of the European Union to the Council of Europe 
In May 2005, the Member states of the Council of Europe, meeting in Warsaw, expressed their wish to see the European Union join the Council of Europe and the European Convention on Human Rights. In practice, the Court of Justice of the European Union rulings have already been delivered in such a way as to be consistent with the rulings of the European Court of Human Rights. This accession is not intended to subordinate the European Union to the Council of Europe, nor even to amend the treaties. This would make it possible to subject to external control the respect for fundamental rights to which the Union's institutions are already subject.

The accession of the European Union was to be made possible by the ratification of Protocol 14 to the Convention for the Protection of Human Rights and Fundamental Freedoms. On 5 April 2013, the European Union and the Council of Europe finalised a draft agreement for the EU's accession to the European Convention on Human Rights. In order to be adopted, the draft agreement had to be submitted to the opinion of the EU Court of Justice, followed by unanimous support from the member states for accession, two-thirds support from the European Parliament and ratification by the national parliaments of the Council of Europe member states. However, on 18 December 2014, the Court of Justice delivered a negative opinion (No 2/2013) on the accession of the European Union to the ECHR. The process therefore came to a halt. After this stalemate, some Italian senators put forward a new proposal, based on a partial merger of the two courts.

Confusion between the two organizations 
The two institutions are often confused, which has led the Council of Europe to try to distinguish itself from the EU. Thus, the Council of Europe website includes a section entitled "Do not get confused" which summarises the various institutional points that need to be distinguished.

This confusion is mainly caused by the closeness of the names of their bodies and institutions.

See also 

 Foreign relations of the European Union

References

External links 
 Memorandum of Understanding between the Council of Europe and the European Union

 
Council of Europe
Council of Europe